The Expert is a British television series produced by the BBC between 1968 and 1976. It ran for 62 episodes over four series.

The series starred Marius Goring as Dr. (later Professor) John Hardy, a forensic pathologist working for the Home Office and was essentially a police procedural drama, with Hardy bringing his forensic knowledge to solve various cases.

The Expert was created and produced by Gerard Glaister. The series was one of the first BBC dramas to be made in colour, and throughout its four series had guest appearances from (among others) John Carson, Peter Copley, Rachel Kempson, Peter Vaughan, Clive Swift, Geoffrey Palmer, Peter Barkworth, Jean Marsh, Ray Brooks, George Sewell, Anthony Valentine, Jeff Shankley, Bernard Lee, Lee Montague, Geoffrey Bayldon, Mike Pratt, Edward Fox, André Morell, Brian Blessed, Nigel Stock, Philip Madoc and Warren Clarke.

Cast
Main recurring characters across all four series.

Archive status
Most of the original videotapes of this show were wiped by the BBC, mainly from series one and two. As a result, 14 episodes are missing, mostly from series one, leaving 48 surviving. Although many episodes survive as black and white telerecordings, the series was produced in colour. Series four and one episode of series three exist as their original colour versions.

Episode List

Later Versions
The idea of a forensic pathologist television series would later be adopted by the American television series' Quincy and CSI and the British television series Silent Witness.

References

External links
 
British Film Institute Screen Online

1968 British television series debuts
1976 British television series endings
1960s British drama television series
1970s British drama television series
British crime drama television series
BBC television dramas
Lost BBC episodes
English-language television shows